3 Maccabees, also called the Third Book of Maccabees, is a book written in Koine Greek, likely in the 1st century BC in Roman Egypt.  Despite the title, the book has nothing to do with the Maccabean Revolt against the Seleucid Empire described in 1 Maccabees and 2 Maccabees.  Instead it tells the story of persecution of the Jews under Pharaoh Ptolemy IV Philopator (222–205 BC) in Ptolemaic Egypt, some decades before the Maccabee uprising in Judea.  The story purports to explain the origin of a Purim-like festival celebrated in Egypt.  3 Maccabees is somewhat similar to the Book of Esther, another book which describes how a king is advised to annihilate the Diaspora Jews in his territory, yet is thwarted by God.

In 3 Maccabees, King Ptolemy IV Philopator attempts to enter the Second Temple in Jerusalem, but is rebuffed by divine power.  He grows to hate Jews, and orders the Jews of Egypt assembled in his hippodrome to be executed by elephants.  However, God protects the Jews, and Ptolemy's elephants trample his own men instead.  Ptolemy experiences a change of heart and lets the Jews go free; the Jews establish a festival in celebration. 

3 Maccabees is considered part of the Biblical Anagignoskomena (deuterocanon) in the Eastern Orthodox Church and some Oriental Orthodox Churches: the Armenian Apostolic Church, the Syriac Orthodox Church, and the Assyrian Church of the East.  Jews, Catholics, and Protestants do not regard it as canonical, though some (the Moravian Brethren as an example) include it in the apocrypha section of their bibles.  The split dates back to the Apostolic Canons approved by the Eastern Church's Council in Trullo in 692 AD but rejected by the Western Church's Pope Sergius I.  Trullo established that the first three books of Maccabees were canonical in the Chalcedonian Eastern Church.

Contents

According to the book, after Ptolemy IV Philopator's victory against Antiochus III in 217 BC at the Battle of Raphia, he visited Jerusalem and the Second Temple. However, he is miraculously prevented from entering the building. This leads him to hate the Jews.  Upon his return to the capital of Alexandria, he orders that all the Jews in the kingdom are to be rounded up and put to death in his hippodrome. Those Jews who agree to abandon their faith are to be spared. 

An attempt to register all the Jews before their execution is thwarted by the sheer number of the Jews. Ptolemy then attempts to have the Jews killed by crushing by elephant and orders 500 elephants to be intoxicated in order to enrage them. However, the execution is repeatedly thwarted.  God first causes Ptolemy to oversleep, then causes him to miraculously forget his anger against the Jews. Ptolemy finally attempts to lead the elephants and his own army into the hippodrome to destroy the Jews personally, but after an impassioned prayer by Eleazar, God sends two angels who prevent this.

Ptolemy abruptly forgets his anger with the Jews and honors them with various immunities and a banquet, with several dates being established as commemorative festivals. The Jews request and receive permission to return home and to kill all the Jews who chose to abandon their faith in order to be spared. The book includes a letter, ostensibly by Ptolemy, to this effect. Finally, the Jews return home.

Authorship and date
The author of this book was likely an Alexandrian Jew who wrote in Greek as part of Hellenistic Judaism. The precise date of authorship is unknown, but the widest plausible range keeping with the text is considered to be between 100 BC and 70 AD. Moses Hadas argues that the work was likely written late in the 1st century BC, perhaps around 25–24 BC. This is because the story attacks the idea of a census (laographia) and its attached poll tax, and the Romans conducted such a census in Roman Egypt in 24 BC. Additionally, publishing a story where a Ptolemaic king acted rashly and was thwarted while the Ptolemies still ruled would be very bold, suggesting a publication date after the Roman absorption of Egypt in 30 BC. The work could then function as an esoteric criticism of Roman policies without naming them directly. This theory has been rejected by more recent authors, because Ptolemy in the book does not claim divine honors as Caligula did. The author does not appear to have knowledge of Roman activities of the later 1st century that caused opposition from Jews such as desecration of sanctuaries. It remains possible the book could have been written earlier in the later Ptolemaic period, possibly with minor updates in the Roman period to explain some of the potential references to later events.

The author is prone to rhetorical constructs and has a bombastic style.  His Greek is excellent and native, including rare and poetic words; he also seems familiar with Hebrew literature, if possibly in translation.  The themes and style of the book are similar to those of 2 Maccabees, the Letter of Aristeas, and the Book of Esther, suggesting the author had read them.  Similar to 2 Maccabees, the author was likely influenced by the "pathetic" (in the sense of pathos) style of Greek argumentation that sought to appeal to emotion and sentiment, with stories such as brides and grooms being dragged away from their homes.

Manuscripts and title
3 Maccabees was preserved due to inclusion in the Septuagint, the Greek Jewish Scriptures.  While Hellenistic Judaism waned with time and the work was not included in the Masoretic canon of the Tanakh (Hebrew scriptures) used by later Jews, early Christians preserved the Septuagint as the basis for the Christian Old Testament, ensuring that the work was not lost.  The lists of books in early manuscripts of the Septuagint were not yet standardized, however.  The Codex Vaticanus lacks the books of Maccabees and the Codex Sinaiticus includes only 1 and 4 Maccabees; only the Codex Alexandrinus includes all of 1, 2, 3, and 4 Maccabees.  The 8th-9th century Venetus, while written much later than Alexandrinus, largely agrees with it, so there are few textual variations.

Lucian of Antioch made a number of changes to his version of the Septuagint, resulting in variant readings.  Lucianic versions became the standard in Syria, Asia Minor, and Constantinople, with the version of 3 Maccanees in the Syriac Peshitta notably Lucianic in character, as well as being a rather free translation that included several expansions. There also exists also a paraphrastic Armenian version that dates to 400–600 AD.

The original title of the book, if any, is unknown.  The Septuagint is what gave the work the title "3 Maccabees", despite being something of a misnomer.  Presumably, this was due to the apparent links to 2 Maccabees and to distinguish it from the other books of Maccabees in the Septuagint.  Similarities with stories in 2 Maccabees include the High Priest Simon II appearing, the father of Onias III who is discussed in 2 Maccabees, and fends off an attempt by Philopator to enter the Temple of Jerusalem; the suffering of Egyptian Jews is described in a similar manner to the martyrdom of Eleazar and the woman with seven sons; Eleazar himself reappears in this story; and two angels appear in the finale of the story to stop a king's anti-Jewish actions, similar to the story of Heliodorus.  The book may also have been referred to by Pseudo-Athanasius as "Ptolemaica" (Ptolemaics).

Historicity
The contents of the book have a legendary character and it is not generally considered reliable as history; it is closer to a romance or historical novel, similar to the Book of Judith or Greek romances.  Some parts of the story, such as the names of the Jews taking up all the paper in Egypt or the king granting the Jews a license to murder apostates, are clearly fictional.  Additionally, the Book of Daniel, generally agreed to have been written around 165 BC, does not mention any such attack by the Ptolemies (referred to there as the "king of the south") against the Temple in its chapter 11 recounting of history as known to the author; as Daniel comprehensively chronicles threats against the Temple, this suggests the story of Ptolemy IV attempting to raid the Temple was invented for literary purposes.  No other ancient sources or histories describe such an alleged persecution under Philopater.  German historian Emil Schürer called the book almost entirely fictitious and a work of the poorest sort.

That said, while many elements of the story are dubious, scholars accept that memories of a genuine persecution might be being described in 3 Maccabees, if distorted.  Josephus writes that many (but certainly not all) Jews were put to death in Alexandria under the reign of Ptolemy VIII Physcon (146–117 BC) due to their support for his rival Cleopatra II, and this execution was indeed carried out by intoxicated elephants. This may be the historical center of the account in 3 Maccabees; the author transferred it to an earlier time period and added an ahistorical connection to Jerusalem if this theory is correct.  Even Josephus's account may be heavily embellished, however.  Alternatively, the book could be describing and opposing a loss of civil rights in the Roman era, and the book was closer to describing troubles the Egyptian Jewish community had after the loss of the reasonably amenable late Ptolemaic rulers and the transition to Roman rule; as described in the speculation on the date of authorship, it is possible that the book was actually describing a contemporary Roman persecution, but moved the setting earlier in time.

The book's opening, a retelling of the Battle of Raphia, is generally agreed to be loosely accurate, if not to the quality of Polybius's version.  It may have been based on a lost history of Ptolemy Megalopolitanus, Philopater's governor of Cyprus.  A possible interpretation that gives credit to the historicity of 3 Maccabees might go something like this: Ptolemy Philopater was more open-minded than many Greeks in that he attempted to integrate non-Greeks into his army and administration, notably native Egyptians.  Doing so required creation of a syncretic religion to unify everyone, Greek and non-Greek alike.  As a devotee of Dionysus, perhaps he attempted to ensure the loyalty of recruited non-Greeks by initiating them into the Dionysian Mysteries in exchange for citizenship (3:21).  Some Jews obeyed but most refused the offer (2:31-33, 3:22-23).  The king was angry and threatened Jews who were already citizens with loss of their status if they did not join, a potential catastrophe that would be remembered for centuries.  The Jews tried bribery (2:32).  While nothing like the attempted mass execution at the hippodrome thwarted by angels occurred, some Jews in the provinces were possibly executed (3:12-30), before eventually the initiative stopped.  Still, this is speculative.

Another theory about the historical basis of the book was advanced by Adolf Büchler in 1899. He held that the book describes the persecution of the Jews in the Fayum region of Egypt. The Jews in Coele-Syria abruptly changed allegiance from the Ptolemies to the Seleucids in 200 BC as a consequence of Seleucid victory in the Fifth Syrian War.  Büchler argues that this put Egyptian Jews under suspicion now that the Temple in Jerusalem was led by a High Priest who answered to the rival Seleucids, triggering a persecution in Egypt.

Theology
Despite clearly being familiar with 2 Maccabees, the author does not appear to agree with some of its tenets.  While describing suffering and evil, the book makes no reference to a future resurrection of the innocent nor future retribution for villains.  While two angels appear in response to a prayer, the author specifically writes that the angels were invisible to the Jews, perhaps suggesting a reluctance to ascribe power or authority to angels rather than God, or a reconciling of conflicting stories.  The author may have been theologically conservative, keeping to classic traditions of Judaism in opposition to the influence of Greek thought on Judaism, such as Greek beliefs on the immortality of the soul that 2 Maccabees includes.

One of the main goals of the book may have been to explain the reason behind the Purim-esque festival celebrated by Egyptian Jews.  In this theory, the origins of the festival had been muddied by time, and the author expanded existing stories of persecution into a story of how God saved the Jews of Egypt.

The author shows a high regard for the power of prayer; the work frequently depicts the Jews praying for aid, and God answering their prayers.  Simon, the Jews collectively, and Eleazar all pray to God in situations of dire need, and these prayers are answered directly.

Influence
3 Maccabees was not influential.  No Jewish writers of the ancient era appear to reference it or be familiar with it, even those who wrote in Greek.  The book was not translated into the Latin Vulgate, hence the Western Church's rejection of including it even as a member of the deuterocanonical books.  While the book was kept in the Greek-speaking Eastern Church's scripture, it is only very rarely referenced or alluded to.  Theodoret briefly summarizes 3 Maccabees in one of his writings, but this is the rare exception; the work had little influence on Christianity.  3 Maccabees is included in the deuterocanon of the Eastern Orthodox Church and some Oriental Orthodox Churches: the Armenian Apostolic Church, the Syriac Orthodox Church, and the Assyrian Church of the East.  The Apostolic Canons approved by the Eastern Church's Council in Trullo in 692 verified 1, 2, and 3 Maccabees were deuterocanonical, but the Council was rejected by the Western Church's Pope Sergius I.

Notes

References

Bibliography

External links
 Early Jewish Writings:  3 Maccabees

1st-century BC books
Anagignoskomena
3
Jewish Ptolemaic history
Jewish texts
Old Testament pseudepigrapha
Texts in Koine Greek
Texts in the Septuagint
Jewish apocrypha
Ptolemy IV Philopator